Events from the year 1877 in Canada.

Incumbents

Crown 
 Monarch – Victoria

Federal government 
 Governor General – Frederick Hamilton-Temple-Blackwood 
 Prime Minister – Alexander Mackenzie
 Chief Justice – William Buell Richards (Ontario)
 Parliament – 3rd

Provincial governments

Lieutenant governors 
 Lieutenant Governor of British Columbia – Albert Norton Richards
 Lieutenant Governor of Manitoba – Alexander Morris (until October 8) then Joseph-Édouard Cauchon
 Lieutenant Governor of New Brunswick – Samuel Leonard Tilley
 Lieutenant Governor of the North-West Territories – David Laird
 Lieutenant Governor of Nova Scotia – Adams George Archibald
 Lieutenant Governor of Ontario – Donald Alexander Macdonald
 Lieutenant Governor of Prince Edward Island – Robert Hodgson
 Lieutenant Governor of Quebec – Luc Letellier de St-Just

Premiers 
 Premier of British Columbia – Andrew Charles Elliott
 Premier of Manitoba – Robert Atkinson Davis
 Premier of New Brunswick – George Edwin King
 Premier of Nova Scotia – Philip Carteret Hill
 Premier of Ontario – Oliver Mowat
 Premier of Prince Edward Island – Louis Henry Davies
 Premier of Quebec – Charles Boucher de Boucherville

Territorial governments

Lieutenant governors 
 Lieutenant Governor of Keewatin – Alexander Morris (until October 8) then Joseph-Édouard Cauchon
 Lieutenant Governor of the Northwest Territories – David Laird

Events
February 28 – University of Manitoba founded.
June 20 – The Great Fire of Saint John, New Brunswick had destroyed over 80 hectares (200 acres) and 1,612 structures including eight churches, six banks, fourteen hotels, eleven schooners and four wood boats.
September 22 – Treaty 7 signed.

Full date unknown
Charles Alphonse Pantaléon Pelletier appointed Minister of Agriculture and called to the Senate of Canada
Manzo Nagano was the first official Japanese immigrant into Canada
Refugee Lakota enter Canada near the end of the Great Sioux War
Sir Wilfrid Laurier is appointed Canadian Minister of Inland Revenue
The provincial legislature creates the University of Manitoba, the oldest University in western Canada.

Births

January 5 – Edgar Nelson Rhodes, politician, Minister and Premier of Nova Scotia (died 1942)
March 25 – Walter Little, politician (died 1961)
May 23 – Fred Wellington Bowen, politician (died 1949)
July 23 – Aimé Boucher, politician and notary (died 1946)
August 5 – Tom Thomson, artist (died 1917)
August 29 – George Arthur Brethen, politician (died 1968)
November 19 – John Alexander Macdonald Armstrong, politician (died 1926)
December 15 – John Thomas Haig, politician (died 1962)
December 18 – James Allison Glen, politician, Minister and Speaker of the House of Commons of Canada (died 1950)
December 26 – Aldéric-Joseph Benoit, politician

Deaths
 January 2 – Jonathan McCully, politician (born 1809)
 May 4 – Charles Wilson, politician (born 1808)
 July 12 – Amand Landry, farmer and politician (born 1805)
 November 3 – William Henry Draper, politician, lawyer, and judge (born 1801)
 November 7 – Joseph-Octave Beaubien, physician and politician (born 1825)
 November 8 – John Cook, politician Ontarian (born 1791)

Historical documents
"Great irregularities" - House of Commons committee finds inefficiency, lethargy and political influence rife in federal civil service

U.S. government report on commerce in the Province of Ontario

Archbishop Taché backs denominational schools in Manitoba

Editorial on the continual exodus of Quebeckers to the U.S.A.

Information pamphlet on a British agricultural colonization scheme for Western Canada

Lecturer says the rights and equality of women are necessary to society

Sitting Bull rejects the offer of a pardon and return to the U.S.A.

References
  

 
Years of the 19th century in Canada
Canada
1877 in North America